Patricia Engel is a Colombian-American writer and author of Vida, which was a PEN/Hemingway Fiction Award Finalist and winner of the Premio Biblioteca de Narrativa Colombiana, Colombia's national prize in literature. She was the first woman, and Vida the first book in translation, to receive the prize.  She is also the author of It's Not Love, It's Just Paris, and the novel The Veins of the Ocean,  which won the 2017 Dayton Literary Peace Prize. The San Francisco Chronicle called Engel, "a unique and necessary voice for the Americas."

Early life and education
Engel was born to Colombian parents who immigrated to the United States. She was raised in New Jersey  and attended public schools. She earned a bachelor's degree in French and Art History from New York University  in 1999 and a Master of Fine Arts degree in fiction from Florida International University in 2007.

She has studied in Paris and has taught creative writing at the University of Miami and elsewhere.

Career
Engel's work has appeared in The Sun, A Public Space, Harvard Review, Kenyon Review, among many others, and has been anthologized in The Best American Short Stories 2017,The Best American Mystery Stories 2014, and more. She was awarded the Boston Review Fiction Prize  in 2008 for her story, "Desaliento," and was the recipient of a fellowship in literature from the National Endowment for the Arts in 2014.

She frequently writes about immigration, biculturalism, and transnationalism  in both English and Spanish.

Her first book, Vida, was a finalist for the 2011 Hemingway Foundation/PEN Award and the 2011 New York Public Library Young Lions Fiction Award. In 2017, Vida received the Premio Biblioteca de Narrativa Colombiana, Colombia's national prize in literature. Vida was also named a New York Times Notable Book of 2010. It also won a Florida Book Award  and an Independent Publisher Book Awards and was named an NPR "Best Debut of the Year."

Engel's debut novel, It's Not Love, It's Just Paris, received the International Latino Book Award in 2014.

Her novel, The Veins of the Ocean, was awarded the 2017 Dayton Literary Peace Prize and named a New York Times Editors' Choice  and a San Francisco Chronicle  Best Book of the Year. The novel follows Reina, a woman in her late twenties who is trying to come to terms with the sadness and guilt she feels after her brother Carlito's incarceration. He is sentenced to death in Florida for throwing his girlfriend's daughter, Shayna, off a bridge.

Engel is a literary editor of the Miami Rail, a quarterly publication providing critical coverage of arts, politics and culture. In 2019, she was awarded a Guggenheim Fellowship in Fiction and an O. Henry Award for her story "Aguacero."

Personal life
Engel now resides between Miami and New York.

Bibliography

Books
2010 Vida  
Translated to Spanish by Alfaguara. 2016.
2013 It is not Love, It's just Paris
Translated to Spanish as No es amor, es solo París by Grijalbo. 2014
2016 The Veins of the Ocean
Translated to French as Les veines de l'océan by Flammarion, 2016.
Translated to Spanish as Las venas del océano by Alfaguara, 2017.
2021 "Infinite Country"

Short Stories
2019 "Mauro and Elena" in Ploughshares
2018 "Aguacero", Kenyon Review May/June
2018 "The Book of Saints", The Sun March
2016 "Campoamor", Chicago Quarterly Review
2015 "Ramiro", Zzzyva
2013 "Aida", Harvard Review
2011 "Fausto", A Public Space
2010 "The Bridge", The Atlantic Fiction For Kindle
2009 "Día", Guernica
2007 "Lucho", Boston Review

Essays and Criticism
"La intimidad de la distancia," Arcadia

Awards and achievements

Recipient of John Simon Guggenheim Memorial Fellowship in Fiction, 2019
Winner an O.Henry Award, 2019
Winner of the Dayton Literary Peace Prize for Fiction, 2017
Recipient of a fellowship from the National Endowment for the Arts, 2014 
Winner of the Premio Biblioteca de Narrativa Colombiana, 2016 
Winner of the International Latino Book Award, 2014 and 2011. 
Pen/Hemingway Foundation Fiction Award Finalist, 2011. 
New York Public Library Young Lions Fiction Award Finalist, 2011. 
Paterson Fiction Prize Finalist, 2011.
Dayton Literary Peace Prize Long list, 2011.
The Story Prize Long list, 2011.

References

External links

Patricia Engel's website
Patricia Engel's page on Grove Atlantic
The Miami Rail

American women writers
Writers from New Jersey
Living people
University of Miami faculty
Year of birth missing (living people)
American women academics
21st-century American women